The English Football League Two, simply known as League Two in England  and for sponsorship purposes as Sky Bet League Two, is the 3rd and lowest division of the English Football League (EFL) and fourth-highest division overall in the English football league system.

Introduced for the 2004–05 English football season as Football League Two, it is a rebrand of the former Football League Third Division, which itself is a rebrand of the now-defunct Football League Fourth Division prior to the 1992 launch of the Premier League.

As of the 2022–23 season, Mansfield Town and Newport County hold the longest tenure in this division following their respective promotions in the 2012–13 season. There are currently two former Premier League clubs competing in this division: Bradford City (1999–2001) and Swindon Town (1993–94).

Structure
There are 24 clubs in this division. Each club plays each of the other clubs twice (once at home and once away) and is awarded three points for a win, one for a draw and no points for a loss. From these points a league table is constructed.

At the end of each season the top three teams, together with the winner of the play-offs between the teams which finished in the fourth to seventh positions, are promoted to EFL League One and are replaced by the four teams that finished at the bottom of that division.

Similarly, the two teams that finished at the bottom of League Two are relegated to the National League and are replaced by the team that finished first and the team that won the second through seventh place play-off in that division. Technically a team can be reprieved from relegation if the team replacing them does not have a ground suitable for League football, but in practice this is a non-factor because every team currently in the National League has a ground that meets the League criteria (and even if they did not, a ground-sharing arrangement with another team could be made until their stadium was upgraded). The other way that a team can be spared relegation is if another team either resigns or is expelled from the EFL.

Final league position is determined, in order, by points obtained, goal difference, goals scored, a mini-league of the results between two or more teams ranked using the previous three criteria, and finally a series of one or more play-off matches.

There is a mandatory wage cap in this division that limits spending on players' wages to 100% of club turnover.

Current members

The following 24 clubs are competing in this division during this current season.

Teams promoted from League Two

Play-off results

Relegated teams

See also
Football League Fourth Division (1958–59 – 1991–92)
Football League Third Division (1992–93 – 2003–04)
List of professional sports teams in the United Kingdom

References and notes

External links

EFL League Two
2004 establishments in England
English Football League
Football leagues in England
Fourth level football leagues in Europe
Sports leagues established in 2004
Professional sports leagues in the United Kingdom